Pattani Airport  is an airport serving Pattani, a town in the Pattani Province of Thailand.

Pattani airport receives flights from the Royal Thai Air Force supporting counter-insurgency operations in the Southern provinces.

References

External links

Airports in Thailand
Pattani province
Airports established in 1963